Nyando is an electoral constituency in Kenya. It is one of seven constituencies of Kisumu County.

The constituency was established for the 1963  elections, but for the next election (1966) the Nyakach Constituency was split out of it. In 1987 Muhoroni Constituency was split from Nyando, while parts of the disestablished Winam Constituency was incorporated into Nyando. It was one of three constituencies of the former Nyando District.

Members of Parliament

Wards

References 
jared okello

External links 
Nyando Constituency

Constituencies in Kisumu County
Constituencies in Nyanza Province
1963 establishments in Kenya
Constituencies established in 1963